Antonia (French: Antonia, romance hongroise) is a 1935 French musical comedy film directed by Jean Boyer and Max Neufeld and starring Marcelle Chantal, Fernand Gravey and Josette Day. It was shot at the Joinville Studios in Paris. A separate English-language version Temptation was also made.

The film's sets were designed by the art director Jacques Colombier.

Cast
 Marcelle Chantal as Antonia  
 Fernand Gravey as Le capitaine Douglas Parker  
 Josette Day as Piri  
 Pierre Larquey as La garçon  
 Alice Tissot La directrice  
 Guy Sloux as Le lieutenant Jonny  
 Robert Arnoux as Pali  
 Jean Worms as Bela de Palmay  
 Pierre Finaly as Le directeur du théâtre  
 Alfred Rode as Le musicien  
 Odette Talazac as Marcza 
 Pierre Athon

References

Bibliography
Wood, Linda. British Films, 1927–1939. British Film Institute, 1986.

External links
 

1935 films
1935 musical comedy films
1930s French-language films
French musical comedy films
Films shot at Joinville Studios
Films directed by Max Neufeld
Films directed by Jean Boyer
French multilingual films
Gaumont Film Company films
French black-and-white films
Films scored by Paul Abraham
1935 multilingual films
1930s French films